Douglas G. Swenson (August 16, 1945 b – February 1, 2009) was an American politician, lawyer, and judge.

Swenson was born in St. Peter, Minnesota and graduated from Bethany Lutheran High School in Mankato, Minnesota, in 1963. He graduated from Gustavus Adolphus College and received his law degree from Mitchell Hamline School of Law in 1971. He lived in Forest Lake, Minnesota with his wife and family. Swenson practiced law in Forest Lake, Minnesota. He served in the Minnesota House of Representatives from 1987 to 1998 and as a Republican. He then served as a Minnesota district court judge. Swenson died from leukemia at the United Hospital in Saint Paul, Minnesota.

References

1945 births
2009 deaths
People from Forest Lake, Minnesota
People from St. Peter, Minnesota
Gustavus Adolphus College alumni
Hamline University School of Law alumni
Minnesota lawyers
Minnesota state court judges
Republican Party members of the Minnesota House of Representatives
Deaths from cancer in Minnesota
Deaths from leukemia